Khoren Levonyan  (born September 16, 1983), is an Armenian presenter and actor. In 2017, Levonyan was awarded with the title of Honored Artist of Armenia. He is the presenter of AMPTV musical program titled Canticle Of Canticles. He is also the grandson of actor and director Khoren Abrahamyan.

References

1983 births
Living people
21st-century Armenian actors
20th-century Armenian male actors
Male actors from Yerevan
Honored artists of Armenia